The Pax Hungarica Movement (PHM) was a far-right Hungarist and neo-Nazi movement, founded on 26 January 2008 to represent an alternative against the Hungarian National Front (MNA). Its predecessor organization was the Blood and Honour Cultural Association.

The leadership of the organization decided to abolish the movement on 31 July 2017 due to large-scale withdrawal of members in the previous years.

References

Neo-Nazism in Hungary
2008 establishments in Hungary
2017 disestablishments in Hungary